Shoaib Ahmed may refer to:

 Shoaib Ahmed (businessman) (born 1964), Indian software evangelist
 Shoaib Ahmed (Indian cricketer) (born 1987), Indian cricketer
 Shoaib Ahmed (Pakistani cricketer) (born 1990), Pakistani cricketer